Symmachia emeralda is a butterfly species in the family Riodinidae. It is present in Ecuador and French Guiana.

References

External links

Symmachia
Fauna of Ecuador
Lepidoptera of French Guiana
Butterflies described in 2002
Riodinidae of South America